The Church of San Blas (Spanish: Iglesia de San Blas) is a church located in Villarrobledo, Spain. It was declared Bien de Interés Cultural in 1977.

The original church was built in mid-15th-century Gothic-style, but later refurbishments add different styles. The retablo dates from the 18th century.

References 

Churches in Castilla–La Mancha
Bien de Interés Cultural landmarks in the Province of Albacete
15th-century Roman Catholic church buildings in Spain
Gothic architecture in Castilla–La Mancha
Villarrobledo